Tomlinia is a genus of sea snails, marine gastropod mollusks in the subfamily Tomliniinae of the family Nassariidae.

Species
 Tomlinia frausseni Thach, 2014
 Tomlinia rapulum (Reeve, 1846)

References

 Peile A.J. (1937) Radula notes III. Proceedings of the Malacological Society of London 22(6): 365-367.

External links
 Galindo, L. A.; Puillandre, N.; Utge, J.; Lozouet, P.; Bouchet, P. (2016). The phylogeny and systematics of the Nassariidae revisited (Gastropoda, Buccinoidea). Molecular Phylogenetics and Evolution. 99: 337-353

Nassariidae